Fillan is the administrative centre of Hitra municipality in Trøndelag county, Norway.

The village was the administrative centre of the old municipality of Fillan that existed from 1886 until 1964.  Fillan Church is located in the village.

Media gallery

References

Villages in Trøndelag
Hitra